Kota Marudu is the capital of the Kota Marudu District in the Kudat Division of Sabah, Malaysia. Its population was estimated to be around 8,716 in 2010. It is located 130 kilometres north of the state capital, Kota Kinabalu, along the federal highway linking Kota Kinabalu with the town of Kudat, near the northern tip of Borneo.

Places of interest in Kota Marudu include Sorinsim Waterfall, located 40 kilometres from the main town, and Sagabon Park, an agriculture research station on Buyut Lake. Kota Marudu also boasts Southeast Asia's largest solar power station. The town celebrates an annual Maize Festival in honour of the agricultural product's contribution to the district's socio-economic development. The line-up of activities includes a variety of exhibitions, competitions, traditional sports and a beauty pageant.

History 
It is not very clear when Kota Marudu was established but it is appeared on 15th century map of borneo by Johannes Cloppenburgh (circa 1632) and map by Benjamin Wright (1601) with name of "Marudo". It th also referred as "Malloodoo" in others old maps.

Etymology  
In some other old map it also refer as Bandau. According to the legend, Bandau is a derivative of the word 'Mondou' from the Rungus dialect which means "the head (leader) of all the beasts". Mondou was once believed to have been found by Aki Rungsud in the area along the Bandau River. The town was renamed 'Kota Marudu' after a fort (kota) built by local warrior named Sharif Usman at Marudu Bay to protect the area from the British North Borneo colonial authorities, where he was considered by the latter as a pirate.

Climate
Kota Marudu has a tropical rainforest climate (Af) with heavy to very heavy rainfall year-round.

References

External links 

Kota Marudu District
Towns in Sabah